Ionuț Răzvan Tofan (born 8 March 1977 in Bucharest) is a Romanian former rugby union footballer. A fly-half, he made his international debut in 1997 and was the Romanian national team's goalkicker during their 2003 World Cup campaign. He has scored 316 points in tests for his country.

Honours

Club
Steaua Bucharest
SuperLiga champion: 1998/99

International
Romania
European Nations Cup: 2000, 2002

External links

1977 births
Living people
Rugby union players from Bucharest
Romanian rugby union players
CSA Steaua București (rugby union) players
Racing 92 players
Rugby union fly-halves
Romania international rugby union players
Expatriate rugby union players in France
Romanian expatriate rugby union players
Romanian expatriate sportspeople in France